Kanō Hōgai (狩野 芳崖, February 27, 1828 – October 5, 1888) was a Japanese painter of the Kanō school.

Life 
The son of the local daimyō's chief painter, he was sent at the age of 18 to Edo to study painting formally. He stayed there for ten years and studied under Kanō Shōsen'in and other prominent artists of the time.

Hōgai would eventually be called upon for such esteemed commissions as ceiling paintings for Edo Castle. He also received the honor of having some of his works displayed at the 1876 Paris International Exposition. However, despite these honors, the economic turmoil created by the fall of the shogunate in 1868 forced Hōgai to seek to support himself with income via more mundane methods. He worked at casting iron, reclaiming land, and running a shop selling writing instruments.

In 1877 Hōgai returned to Edo, now called Tokyo, and worked for the wealthy Shimazu clan; this gave him the opportunity to study works by some of Japan's greatest painting masters, including Sesshū and Sesson.

In 1884, Hōgai attracted the attention of Ernest Fenollosa, an art critic and collector from New England, who befriended him and bought several of his paintings. Along with Fenollosa, Okakura Kakuzō and Hashimoto Gahō, Hōgai then took part in the Painting Appreciation Society (観画会, Kangakai). The Society was created to draw attention to the traditional Japanese arts, particularly classical art of the Heian and Nara periods which were beginning to be seriously neglected, with many works sold or even destroyed due to Japan's newfound interest in the West.

Gallery

References

Baekeland, Frederick (1985). "Kanō Hōgai." Kodansha Encyclopedia of Japan. Tokyo: Kodansha Ltd.

Ukiyo-e
1828 births
1888 deaths
Kanō school
19th-century Japanese people
19th-century Japanese artists
19th-century painters
19th-century Japanese painters
People from Shimonoseki
Buddhist artists
Artists from Yamaguchi Prefecture